The Solution may refer to:

The Solution (Mannafest album), an album by indie rock band Mannafest
The Solution (Beanie Sigel album), an album by rapper Beanie Sigel
The Solution (Buckshot and 9th Wonder album), a collaboration album by rapper Buckshot and producer 9th Wonder
The Solution (band), a soul band featuring Scott Morgan and Nicke Royale
The Solution (Animorphs), the twenty-second book in the Animorphs series
"The Solution" (Alias episode), an episode of the television series Alias
"Die Lösung" (poem), a poem by Bertolt Brecht whose title is usually translated as "The Solution"

See also 
 Solution (disambiguation)
 The Final Solution